Swint is a surname. Notable people with the surname include:

John Joseph Swint (1879–1962), American Roman Catholic prelate
Kerwin Swint (born 1962), American political scientist